Graphosia ochracea is a moth of the family Erebidae. It was described by George Thomas Bethune-Baker in 1904. It is found in New Guinea. The habitat consists of mountainous areas.

References

External links

Lithosiina
Moths described in 1904